The Avalanche Peaks are two mountain peaks situated above the Arwa Valley to the northwest of Badrinath in the Indian state of Uttarakhand. The peaks are named for the avalanches experienced by early climbers seeking to cross the glaciers beneath them.

Avalanche Peak I 
Avalanche Peak I is situated on north-south massif between Kalindi Bamak and the Arwa Bank. This is the main peak among the two and situated south to the Avalanche Peak II. The altitude of the summit is 6196 metres. 

The peak was first climbed in 1931 by Eric Shipton and Frank Smythe with two Sherpas.

Avalanche Peak II

Avalanche Peak II is the higher and more northerly peak. It is situated south of the Kalindi Khal which separates the Chaturangi glacier from the Arwa valley. The altitude of the summit is 6443 metres.

Neighbouring peaks
 Chandra Parbat
 Chaturangi
 Kalindi

See also
 List of Himalayan peaks of Uttarakhand
 Arwa Group

External links

Mountains of Uttarakhand
Tourist attractions in Uttarakhand
Geography of Chamoli district